Filippo Palizzi (1818 – 1899) was an Italian painter.

Biography
Filippo Palizzi was born in Vasto (Chieti). He moved to Naples in 1837 and enrolled at the Royal Institute of Fine Arts, but withdrew after a few months to attend the private school of the painter Giuseppe Bonolis. Contact with his brother Giuseppe, who moved to France in 1844, introduced him to the painting of the Barbizon School. He visited Paris on the occasion of the Universal Exhibition in 1855 and then went on to the Netherlands. Having returned to Paris in 1863, he concentrated on nature studies from life and took part in the Universal Exhibition of 1867, winning a gold medal. The following decade saw further work on the handling of light both in landscapes painted outdoors and in paintings of interiors. He often painted genre scenes of children with animals.

His only painting at the Museum of Capodimonte, the Exodus of Animals from the Ark, is a parade of different species.

An advocate of the need to bring academic teaching up to date, he founded the Naples Società Promotrice di Belle Arti in 1861 together with Domenico Morelli and the Museo Artistico Industriale in 1878, being appointed director two years later. Filippo Palizzi was named commendatore of the Order of the Crown of Italy and of the Austrian Order of Franz Joseph, and honorary Associate of numerous Academies.  He died in Naples in 1899.

His brothers Francesco Paolo (1825-1871), Giuseppe (1812-1888), and Nicola Palizzi (1820-1877) were also painters.

Among his many  pupils were Giovanni Patrone and Gaetano de Vito.

Artworks

References
 Laura Casone, Filippo Palizzi , online catalogue Artgate by Fondazione Cariplo, 2010, CC BY-SA (source for the first revision of this article).

•	
Palizzi Filippo, in Vasto Gallery, blog of Filippo Marino, http://vastogallery.blogspot.com/

19th-century Italian painters
Italian male painters
Painters from Naples
1818 births
1899 deaths
Academic staff of the Accademia di Belle Arti di Napoli
19th-century Italian male artists